Esperia is a comune (municipality) in the Province of Frosinone in the Italian region Lazio, located about  southeast of Rome and about  southeast of Frosinone. It is located within the Monti Aurunci Natural Park.

History
According to some theories, the foundation of the town would be linked to the destruction of the Roman colony of Interamna Lirenas, although the first historically documented human presence dates to the foundation of several monasteries, with the annexed boroughs, by the Abbey of Montecassino (10th century).

The name "Esperia" was chosen in 1867 when  the current frazioni of   Roccaguglielma and San Pietro merged into a single municipality, with the former as the municipal seat.

During  World War II Esperia was one of the towns suffering heavily from "Marocchinate" - the mass rape committed after the Battle of Monte Cassino by Goumiers, Moroccan colonial troops of the French Expeditionary Corps. Esperia's mayor at the time reported that in his town, 700 women out of 2,500 inhabitants were raped and that some had died as a result.

Johnny Roselli, infamous American mobster, was born in Esperia in 1905; his real name being Filippo Sacco.

Main sights
The church of Santa Maria Maggiore and San Filippo Neri in Esperia Superiore houses a painting by Taddeo Zuccari and a 1521 bas-relief. The Baroque Lauretana Chapel, in Esperia Inferiore dedicated to the Madonna di Loreto has a 16th-century wooden Madonna and several paintings by Luca Giordano.

Other churches include San Pietro  in Esperia Inferiore, San Donato on Monte D'Oro, Santa Maria di Montevetro on Monte Montevetro (with 15th-century frescoes) and the 16th-century Sanctuary of Madonna delle Grazie, located near the remains of the castle, Santa Maria Maggiore in Monticelli, San Francesco adjoined to the Casa di Riposo in Esperia Superiore, Santa Rosa located in Badia di Esperia. The ancient monastery of San Pietro in Foresta located in Monticelli, now only a tower remains today.

Dinosaur footprints were discovered in 2006 in the locality of San Martino.

References

Cities and towns in Lazio